Robert Egan (born 1958) is an American restaurateur and an interlocutor between North Korea and the United States.

Robert Egan may also refer to:
 Robert Egan (footballer), Republic of Ireland international footballer
 Robert J. Egan (Michigan politician), mayor of Flint
 Robert J. Egan (Illinois politician) (1931–2002), American politician, lawyer, and judge
 Robert Shaw Egan, botanist and lichenologist